KZXQ (104.5 FM) is a radio station licensed to Reserve, New Mexico, United States.   The station is owned by Cochise Broadcasting LLC. The station has obtained a construction permit from the U.S. Federal Communications Commission (FCC) for a power increase to 820 watts.

References

External links

ZXQ